Thomas Bergmann (born 20 September 1989) is an Austrian footballer who currently plays for FC Zirl.

References

Austrian footballers
Austrian Football Bundesliga players
2. Liga (Austria) players
SK Rapid Wien players
FC Wacker Innsbruck (2002) players
SV Ried players
1989 births
Living people
Association football midfielders
Footballers from Vienna